Huaiyi may refer to:

 Huaiyi people, a branch of the ancient Dongyi people
 Xue Huaiyi or Huaiyi, Tang dynasty monk
 Li Cou or Crown Prince Huaiyi, Tang dynasty prince

See also
 Guo Huaiyi